Fremont County School District #21 is a public school district based in Fort Washakie, Wyoming, United States.

Geography
Fremont County School District #21 is located in west central Fremont County and serves the following communities:

Census-designated places (Note: All census-designated places are unincorporated.)
Boulder Flats (very small portion)
Ethete (very small portion)
Fort Washakie
Johnstown (partial)

Schools
(Note: All schools are located on a single-campus.)
Fort Washakie Charter High School (Grades 9–12)
Fort Washakie Middle School (Grades 7–8)
Fort Washakie Elementary School (Grades PK-6)

Student demographics
The following figures are as of October 1, 2009.

Total District Enrollment: 474
Student enrollment by gender
Male: 247 (52.11%)
Female: 227 (47.89%)
Student enrollment by ethnicity
American Indian or Alaska Native: 448 (94.51%)
Black or African American: 1 (0.21%)
Hispanic or Latino: 14 (2.95%)
Two or More Races: 7 (1.48%)
White: 4 (0.84%)

See also
List of school districts in Wyoming

References

External links
Fremont County School District #21 – official site.

Education in Fremont County, Wyoming
School districts in Wyoming